The 2009 North Queensland Cowboys season was the 15th season in the club's history. Coached by Neill Henry and captained by Johnathan Thurston, they competed in the National Rugby League's 2009 Telstra Premiership and finished the regular season 12th place, failing to reach the finals for the second consecutive year.

Season summary 
The 2009 season was an improvement on 2008 for the Cowboys, with 11 wins from 24 games. The closeness of the 2009 season meant the Cowboys finished 12th, just three points behind eventual Grand Finalists Parramatta, who finished 8th.

Neil Henry re-joined the club as head coach in 2009, taking over from interim head coach Ian Millward. Henry was an assistant coach at the club from 2002 to 2006, before moving to the Canberra Raiders in 2007 and winning the Dally M Coach of the Year award in 2008. Renowned strength and conditioning coach Billy Johnstone also returned to the club after a stint at the Gold Coast Titans. The club's key off-season recruits included Australian and Queensland representatives Willie Tonga, Antonio Kaufusi and Shannon Hegarty.

After a slow start to the season, the Cowboys enjoyed a strong run of form that included a four-game winning streak. With five rounds to play, they were sitting inside the top eight in 6th position. The club then endured four-game losing streak to end the season, dropping to 12th place.

2009 saw the debut of James Tamou, who joined the club from the Sydney Roosters under-20's side. Tamou would become an Australian and New South Wales representative at the Cowboys and play integral role in the club's maiden premiership victory in 2015.

Milestones 
 Round 1: Shannon Hegarty, Antonio Kaufusi, Manase Manuokafoa and Willie Tonga made their debuts for the club.
 Round 2: Grant Rovelli made his debut for the club.
 Round 5: Steve Southern played his 100th game for the club.
 Round 5: Steve Rapira made his NRL debut.
 Round 8: James Tamou made his NRL debut.
 Round 15: Michael Bani made his debut for the club.
 Round 17: Luke O'Donnell played his 100th game for the club.
 Round 17: Johnathan Thurston played his 100th game for the club.
 Round 17: Aaron Payne played his 150th game for the club.
 Round 22: Donald Malone made his NRL debut.
 Round 26: Ray Thompson made his NRL debut.

Squad List

Squad Movement

2009 Gains

2009 Losses

Ladder

Fixtures

Pre-season

Regular season

Statistics 

Source:

Representatives 
The following players have played a representative match in 2009

Honours

League 
 Dally M Halfback of the Year: Johnathan Thurston
 RLIF Halfback of the Year: Johnathan Thurston

Club 
 Paul Bowman Medal: Luke O'Donnell
 Player's Player: Luke O'Donnell
 Club Person of the Year: Clint Amos
 Rookie of the Year: Steve Rapira
 Most Improved: Scott Bolton
 NYC Player of the Year: Dane Hogan

Feeder Clubs

National Youth Competition 
  North Queensland Cowboys - 9th, missed finals

Queensland Cup 
  Mackay Cutters - 12th, Wooden Spoon
  Northern Pride - 2nd, Runners-up

References

External links 
 North Queensland Cowboys: Season Review - NRL.com

North Queensland Cowboys seasons
North Queensland Cowboys season